Aso ni San Roque (International title: San Roque's Pet / ) is a Philippine television drama fantasy series broadcast by GMA Network. Directed by Don Michael Perez, it stars Mona Louise Rey. It premiered on September 10, 2012, on the network's Telebabad line up replacing Makapiling Kang Muli. The series concluded on January 11, 2013, with a total of 90 episodes. It was replaced by Indio in its timeslot.

Premise
Separated from her birth parents at a very young age, a blind girl named Fatima grows up under the protective wing of Mother Ben, an old gay man under the control of a criminal syndicate. Since then, Mother Ben has been her sole protector, and uses Fatima's disability to help her escape hardships and mischief caused by the cruel syndicate.

Aside from having a pure, good heart, a dark secret lies within Fatima. She is the daughter of a mortal man and a manananggal, a traditional demoness that separates at the midsection so the upper half can fly at night to feed on blood. Fatima is thus the subject of a prophecy that spells the end of all evil beings on earth.

As Fatima reaches the age of seven, the search for her intensifies as witches, centaurs, mermaids and other malignant creatures join forces to prevent the girl from fulfilling the prophecy.

Cast and characters

Lead cast
 Mona Louise Rey as Fatima Salvador 
A blind girl with a golden heart who is the offspring of a mortal and a manananggal. Behind her persona is a prophecy that destined her to end the dark forces that plaguing the human race. Because of this mission, her life is now in danger as the legions of darkness are lurking to kill her to prevent her from fulfilling the prophecy.
 Princess the dog as Anghel
St. Roch's dog who came to life to be Fatima's guide through her quests and battles to defeat the evil forces.

Supporting cast
 LJ Reyes as Lualhati Salvador / Lourdes
Mateo's great love. Lourdes is a beautiful and kind-hearted young lady. But behind this beautiful persona concealed a dark secret—she belongs to a family of manananggal, but the reluctant one. This revelation altered the love Lourdes and Mateo hoped to share together for life. This dim chapter in Lourdes' life turns into a joy as she gives birth to Mateo's child—a beautiful baby girl she named Fatima.  But another tragic twist of fate unwittingly leads Lourdes apart from her baby.
 TJ Trinidad as Police C/Insp. Mateo Salvador
A righteous, very principled and reliable policeman with a scarred past—one that continues to haunt him till this very day. In the wake of his doomed romance with Lourdes, Mateo vows vengeance on the whole manananggal race, completely unaware that Lourdes is carrying his child. Years passed. In an unexpected turn of events, he cross paths with a blind beggar named Fatima and eventually became attached to her, unaware of their real connection.
 Pen Medina as Ben "Mother Ben" Asino
An old gay man who happens to be under the control of a syndicate. Loud and unconventional. He is a merry deviant in a cheerless world of misery and tears. He adopts Fatima and from then on, he became the sole protector of the poor, blind little girl.
 Eddie Garcia as Supremo
The powerful head of all aswangs. Though he acknowledges the age-old adage that good will always triumph over evil, this does not prevent him from trying to make a difference. His mission is to spread evilness to mankind, to conquer the earth and make it his kingdom and to kill the blessed child, Fatima.
 Gardo Versoza as Kanlaon
The king of the "aswang ng hangin" or the winged-vampires, better known in Philippine mythology as manananggal. He goes to great length to find and kill Fatima to prevent her from fulfilling the prophecy.
 Angelika Dela Cruz as Bulan
An evil witch, who also ruled as the queen of the "aswang ng apoy" or the fire-powered witches. In the real world, she is known as the ruthless and fearless head of a syndicate involved in child trafficking and where Mother Ben and Fatima work. Legend has it that Bulan was once a goodhearted person, but the tragic death of her beloved husband and son led her to embraced evilness. She is the traitor to aswang's by not listening to Supremo.
 Gwen Zamora as Anaira
An evil mermaid who also ruled as the queen of the "aswang ng tubig" or the sea-based evil creatures. She preys on fishermen by using her mesmerizing beauty and charm. Anaira apparently has a soft spot for children, converting them into her minions whenever possible. This makes her the least motivated at hunting down the prophesied child. She now seeks to become Fatima's surrogate mother, unaware that she is the very child her brethren seeks to eliminate. Because of that soft spot her human heart and mind has a conscience and still has good in her heart.
 Paolo Contis as Sento / Peter Silverio
The leader of the "aswang ng lupa" or the land-based aswangs. In his past life, he was Peter Silverio, a wealthy and popular equestrian who sold his soul to the devil to regain his strength and to have eternal life. Using his strength and fast ability, he preys on people that's cross his paths, most commonly virgin women and lost travelers.
 Rich Asuncion as Bernice Montemayor
An ambitious, aggressive and tough TV reporter/journalist. She is so focused and she would do everything to attain her goals and would do everything for the man she loves—Mateo. Although not intentionally she led Bulan and Sento to Fatima before she can get to Mateo and in the process she became a mixture of n aswang of lupa and apoy by them.
 Eddie Garcia as Police Director Danilo P. Aragon
The husband of Doña Constancia and the brave and principled head of "Task Force Kababalaghan" or the paranormal division of National Police. His son was killed by the aswang and vows to take revenge on them.
 Boots Anson-Roa as Doña Constancia Aragon
The wife of Director General Danilo Aragon, a rich and strict woman who finds Fatima while wandering in the streets with her pet dog, Anghel. Upon learning that the girl is an orphan, Constancia takes her to her mansion to look after her.
 Gene Padilla as SPO3 Paul Andrade
Mateo's bubbling, yet loyal, sidekick and fellow cop. Serves as the series' source of comic relief, he apparently suffers from an allergy to dogs; and because of that, he can tell whenever Angel the dog is within his vicinity, much to Mateo's convenience.
 Nova Villa as Ofelia Sandoval
The aunt of Mateo who also acts as his surrogate mother. Deeply religious and full of virtue. She also served as one of Mateo’s sources of comfort in his times of distress, and has some knowledge concerning the supernatural, such as the Tikbalang's weakness.
 Buboy Garovillo as Noah
A former clergyman who lost his mind after he witnessed the tragic death of his family.

Guest cast
 Rafael Rosell as Anton Martinez
 Diva Montelaba as Ruka
 Ehra Madrigal as Lena Martinez
 Sherilyn Reyes-Tan as Diga
 Gerard Pizarras as Iwak
 Raquel Montesa as Anton's mother
 Ervic Vijandre as Robert Tolentino
 Ryza Cenon as Grace Santos
 Mariz Ricketts as Rosa Santiago
 Djanin Cruz as Zita Dizon
 Kiel Rodriguez as Timo Magno
 Roldan Aquino as General
 Miguel Tanfelix as Onyok
 Julian Marcus Trono as Joem
 Chinggay Riego as Oryang
 Mary Joy Gula as Kiting
 Barbara Miguel as Didi
 Elvis Gutierrez as Marcus

Production and development
Originally created/conceptualized by writer and director, Jun Lana for GMA Network, Aso ni San Roque is a drama-fantasy-adventure serial lies in the old "battle between good and evil" plot. Contrary to the first report published in entertainment news website, PEP (Philippine Entertainment Portal), the series is not based from Lana's 2012 Cinemalaya Philippine Independent Film Festival entry, Bwakaw. Lana clarifies that the series is actually inspired from San Roque and his canine's moving story. San Roque, also known as Saint Roch or Saint Rocco, is the saint usually depicted in statue form in Catholic churches as the one with a walking stick on the left hand, while the other hand is pointing on to a wound on one of his knees with a dog sitting by his side. The Catholic Church named him patron of dogs, plague, pestilence and AIDS. He is also the patron saint of invalids. In the series, San Roque brought his dog come to life to save and be a guide to Fatima, the blessed child who prophesied to be the one who will end the existence of evil entities on earth. Using a saint as part of a drama series is actually not new for the network, as they already used the same formula/format [miracle, apparition] in their previous TV series like in 2007 television adaptation of the film, Mga Mata ni Anghelita (lit. Angelita's Eyes) and in 2010 fantasy-dramedy series Magic Palayok (lit. The Magic Clay Pot).

The series also highlights Pinoy mythology by putting aswang, manananggal, tikbalang, bruha and sirena as part [villains] of the story. Series' director, Don Michael Perez stated that, the network is aiming to enrich Filipinos [especially the young ones] knowledge of the country's rich culture, beliefs and mythology by using this kind of concept, just like what the network did in their past television series, in the likes of Darna, Dyesebel, Joaquin Bordado and Luna Mystika. In the story, the aswangs are divided into four classes: Aswang ng Hangin, most commonly known as the manananggals or the winged-vampires. It headed by the dreadful Kanlaon which played by Gardo Versoza; the Aswang ng Lupa or the land-based evil entities, who ruled by Sento, played by Paolo Contis, the heartless half-human, half-horse creature popularly known as the tikbalang; Aswang ng Tubig or the sea-based evil creatures. It headed by Queen Anaira, an evil mermaid which portrayed by Gwen Zamora; and the Aswang ng Apoy or the fire-powered witches ruled by Bulan, played by Angelika dela Cruz.

Casting
The cast was first presented during the series' story conference held on August 2, 2012, at GMA Network Center. Mona Louise Rey was chosen to play the role of Fatima, the protagonist. Rey, who rose in stardom after the successful drama series Munting Heredera, felt overwhelmed with the network's support for her career and at the same time, excited for the role assigned on her.

Meanwhile, Princess, a two-year-old half Golden Retriever and half Cocker Spaniel, was chosen to be part of the series as Anghel, San Roque's dog who defend and guide the main character through her adventures. Don Michael Perez said, "Princess, is definitely born to be a star," he says. The dog's trainer Ergie Estrella said that he did not encounter difficulty in training the star dog, saying that all it takes is positive reinforcement.

TJ Trinidad and LJ Reyes shared equally important roles in the series. Reyes considered this series as her biggest break ever. After being typecast in villain characters [she's associated in her villainous roles in Time of My Life and The Good Daughter, the network assigned her to play one of the main characters in the series, as birthmother of Mona Louise Rey's character. In one of her interviews, Reyes said that it's her first time to play a mother role on TV but she doesn't mind doing it as long as the story is good and the character, as well. Meanwhile, Trinidad is all praise for his screen partner, said that Reyes is nice and very committed. "And I think, it’s gonna be a good partnership for the show and, you know, with the whole cast, story, and the script, it’s so exciting. Very fast-paced", he added.

The dark forces or the main antagonists of the story are portrayed by Angelika dela Cruz, Gardo Versoza, Gwen Zamora and Paolo Contis. Dela Cruz was cast as Bulan, an evil witch and the leader of the syndicate; Versoza playing Kanlaon, the king of the manananggals; Zamora playing the role of Anaira, an evil mermaid; while Contis playing the role of Sento, the leader of the tikbalangs.

Rafael Rosell had a guest role in the series. He played Anton, the man who saved LJ Reyes' character from the wrath of manananggals. This served as his first project in GMA Network.

Pen Medina was cast as mother Ben, an elderly gay and the adoptive parent to the lead character. Originally, the role was offered to Eddie Garcia but due to health concern, Garcia later requested the producers to give him less time-demanding character. He portrayed the role of Supremo, instead.

Ratings
According to AGB Nielsen Philippines' Mega Manila household television ratings, the pilot episode of Aso ni San Roque earned a 26.2% rating. While the final episode scored a 24.2% rating.

References

External links
 

2012 Philippine television series debuts
2013 Philippine television series endings
Fantaserye and telefantasya
Filipino-language television shows
GMA Network drama series
Television shows set in Manila